Montrabé is a commune in the Haute-Garonne department of southwestern France. Montrabé station has rail connections to Toulouse, Albi and Castres.

Population
The inhabitants of the commune are known as Montrabéens in French.

Monuments

See also
Communes of the Haute-Garonne department

References

Communes of Haute-Garonne